Live 1986, also known as Eric Clapton & Friends Live 1986 or The Eric Clapton concert is a concert film released by the British rock musician Eric Clapton. It was originally released on VHS in 1987 and later re-released on DVD in 2003. In addition to the video release, a compact disc was released in 2007. The concert was recorded at the National Exhibition Centre in Birmingham on 15 July 1986.

Reception
Music critic Anneke Brüning notes that the release features a shorter DVD track listing than its rival Live at Montreux 1986, but thinks the Live 1986 release is not less interesting. The release reached number two on the British music video charts, compiled by the Official Charts Company. Both the album and video release were certified with a gold certification award in the United Kingdom. Other golden discs were presented to Clapton for outstanding sales figures in Australia, Brazil and Canada.

Track listing
"Crossroads" (Robert Johnson)
"White Room" (Jack Bruce · Pete Brown)
"Run" (Eric Clapton)
"Miss You" (Eric Clapton · Greg Phillinganes · Bobby Colomby)
"Tearing Us Apart" (Eric Clapton · Greg Phillinganes)
"Holy Mother" (Eric Clapton · Stephen Bishop)
"In the Air Tonight" (Phil Collins)
"Layla" (Eric Clapton · Jim Gordon)
"Sunshine of Your Love" (Eric Clapton · Jack Bruce · Pete Brown)

Personnel
Eric Clapton – Electric guitar · Lead vocals
Greg Phillinganes – Keyboard · Background vocals
Phil Collins – Drums · Vocals
Nathan East – Bass guitar · Background vocals

Chart positions

Weekly charts

Certifications

References

1987 films
2003 films
1987 video albums
2003 video albums
2007 live albums
Concert films
Eric Clapton live albums
Eric Clapton video albums
Warner Records live albums
Warner Records video albums
2000s English-language films
1980s English-language films